María Teresa Viana Aché (born 26 March 1993) is an indoor and field hockey player from Uruguay.

Personal life
Teresa Viana comes from a large family, being one of twelve siblings.

Career

Indoor
Teresa Viana made her debut for the Uruguayan indoor team at the 2017 Indoor Pan American Cup in Georgetown, where she won a bronze medal.

She went on to represent the team again at the 2021 Indoor Pan American Cup in Spring City, Pennsylvania.

Field hockey
Viana made her debut for the national team in 2012 during the inaugural season of the FIH World League.

She was a member of the team at the 2017 Pan American Cup in Lancaster. The following year she won a silver medal at the 2018 South American Games in Cochabamba.

In 2019, she appeared at the FIH Series Finals in Hiroshima, and the Pan American Games in Lima.

References

External links

1993 births
Living people
Female field hockey forwards
Uruguayan female field hockey players
Sportspeople from Montevideo
South American Games silver medalists for Uruguay
South American Games bronze medalists for Uruguay
South American Games medalists in field hockey
Competitors at the 2018 South American Games
Competitors at the 2022 South American Games
21st-century Uruguayan women